Up from the Ashes is the second album by American hard rock band Burn Halo, released on June 28, 2011, through Rawkhead Records.

Frontman James Hart has commented that this is the band's first effort written and recorded as a band, as the band's previous album was all written by Hart himself with outside writers, and recorded by Hart with session musicians.

The first single, "Tear It Down" was released on iTunes on April 19, 2011. On June 16, 2011, the band streamed "Dakota", another new song from the upcoming album, on Revolver Magazine's website, as well as on their Facebook page. On July 7, 2011, the music video for "Tear It Down" made its debut.

Track listing

Personnel
James Hart  – lead vocals
Joey Roxx  – lead guitar
Brandon Lynn  – rhythm guitar
Aaron Boehler  – bass
Dillon Ray  – drums, percussion

References

2011 albums
Burn Halo albums